I Am Legend is a 1954 post-apocalyptic horror novel by American writer Richard Matheson that was influential in the modern development of zombie and vampire literature and in popularizing the concept of a worldwide apocalypse due to disease. The novel was a success and was adapted into the films The Last Man on Earth (1964), The Omega Man (1971), and I Am Legend (2007). It was also an inspiration for George A. Romero's Night of the Living Dead (1968).

Plot
Implicitly set on Cimarron Street in 1976 Los Angeles after an apocalyptic war that ravages the land with weekly dust storms, the novel details the life of Robert Neville in the months and eventually years after the outbreak of a pandemic that has killed the rest of the human population and turned infected survivors into "vampires". The vampires conform remarkably to their stereotypes in fiction and folklore: they are blood-sucking, pale-skinned, and nocturnal, though otherwise indistinguishable from normal humans. Neville, possibly the sole survivor of the pandemic, barricades himself indoors nightly as swarms of vampires violently surround his house. He is further protected by the traditional vampire repellents of garlic, mirrors, and crucifixes. During the day, the vampires are inactive, allowing Neville to drive around stabbing them with wooden stakes (since they seem impervious to his guns' bullets), which causes them to instantly liquefy, and scavenging for supplies. Occasional flashbacks reveal the horrors of how the disease claimed the lives of his wife and daughter.

Suffering from extreme isolation, depression, and alcoholism, Neville determines there must be some scientific reasons behind the vampires' origins, behaviors, and oddly specific aversions, so he gradually researches at his local library, discovering that the root of the disease is probably a Bacillus strain of bacteria capable of infecting both living and deceased ("undead") hosts. His experiments with microscopes also reveal that the bacteria are deadly sensitive to garlic and sunlight. After he painstakingly attempts to win the trust of a stray sickly dog that dies after only a week, Neville, heartbroken, commits himself even more vigorously to his studies. Soon he experiments directly on incapacitated vampires, which leads to a new theory that vampires are affected by mirrors and crosses because of "hysterical blindness", in which the infected now delusionally react as they believe they should when confronted with these items. Neville additionally discovers that exposing vampires to direct sunlight or inflicting wide oxygen-exposing wounds causes the bacteria to switch from being anaerobic symbionts to aerobic parasites, rapidly consuming their hosts when exposed to air and thus giving them the appearance of instantly liquefying. However, he discovers the bacteria also produce resilient "body glue" that instantaneously seals blunt or narrow wounds, explaining how the vampires are bulletproof. Lastly, he deduces now that there are in fact two differently-reacting types of vampires: conscious ones who are living with a worsening infection and undead ones who have died but been partly reanimated by the bacteria.

After three years, Neville suddenly sees a terrified woman named Ruth in broad daylight. The two cautiously gain each other's trust and even share a romantic embrace. Neville explains some of his findings, including his theory that he developed immunity against the infection after being bitten by an infected vampire bat years ago. He prepares to test Ruth to determine if she is infected or immune, vowing to treat her if she is infected, but she knocks him unconscious. When Neville wakes, he discovers a note from her confessing that she is indeed a vampire herself. Her note suggests that only the undead vampires are pathologically violent but not those, like her, who were alive at the time of infection and who still survive due to chance mutations. These living-infected have slowly overcome their disease and are gradually developing a new society and new medications. Ruth admits she was sent to spy on him by her comrades and that he was responsible for the deaths of many of her fellow vampires, including her husband. Still, Ruth reiterates her romantic feelings for Neville and urges him to flee the city to avoid capture. 

Neville ignores Ruth's warning, assuming he will be treated fairly by the new society of living-infected. However, his mind is changed when he watches a group of them annihilate the undead vampires outside his home with fiendish glee. In a panic, Neville opens fire on them but is in turn shot and subdued. Imprisoned and dying, he is visited by Ruth, who informs him that she is a senior member of the new society but, unlike the others who perceive him as a murderer, she does not resent him. She acknowledges the public need for Neville's execution but, out of mercy, gives him a packet of fast-acting suicide pills. Neville accepts his fate and asks Ruth not to let this society become too heartless. Ruth promises to try, kisses him, and leaves. Neville goes to his prison window and sees the infected staring back at him with the same hatred and fear that he once felt for them. He realizes that he, a remnant of old humanity, is now a legend to the new race born of the infection. He acknowledges that their desire to kill him, after he has killed so many of their loved ones, is not something he can condemn. As the pills take effect, he is amused by the thought that he will become their new superstition and legend, just as vampires once were to humans.

Critical reception
As related in In Search of Wonder (1956), Damon Knight wrote: 

Galaxy reviewer Groff Conklin described Legend as: 

Anthony Boucher praised the novel: 

Dan Schneider from International Writers Magazine: Book Review wrote: 

In 2012, the Horror Writers Association gave I Am Legend the special Vampire Novel of the Century Award.

Influence
Although Matheson calls the assailants in his novel "vampires" and their condition is transmitted through bacteria in the blood and garlic is a repellant to this strain of bacteria, they have little similarity to vampires as developed by John William Polidori and his successors, which came straight out of the gothic fiction tradition.

In I Am Legend, the "vampires" share more similarities with zombies, and the novel influenced the zombie genre and popularized the concept of a worldwide zombie apocalypse.

Although the idea has now become commonplace, a scientific origin for vampirism or zombies was fairly original when written.

According to Clasen: 

Although referred to as "the first modern vampire novel", it is as a novel of social theme that I Am Legend made a lasting impression on the cinematic zombie genre, by way of director George A. Romero, who acknowledged its influence and that of its original cinematic adaptation, The Last Man on Earth (1964), upon his seminal film Night of the Living Dead (1968).

Discussing the creation of Night of the Living Dead, Romero remarked: 

Moreover, film critics have noted similarities between Night of the Living Dead (1968) and The Last Man on Earth (1964).

Stephen King said: "Books like I Am Legend were an inspiration to me." Film critics noted that the British film 28 Days Later (2002) and its sequel 28 Weeks Later both feature a rabies-type plague ravaging Great Britain, analogous to I Am Legend.

Tim Cain, the producer, lead programmer and one of the main designers of the 1997 computer game Fallout cited I Am Legend and the movie The Omega Man as influences on the game: 

TheDoctor Who episode "Asylum of the Daleks" sees Oswin Oswald introduced in a similar fashion to Neville as an homage to the novel, with both Oswin and Neville checking defences, boarding up the door/window, listening to classical music, and turning it up to drown out the sound of the enemies outside (Daleks for Oswin, vampires for Neville).

Adaptations

Comics

The book has also been adapted into a comic book miniseries titled Richard Matheson's I Am Legend by Steve Niles and Elman Brown. It was published in 1991 by Eclipse Comics and collected into a trade paperback by IDW Publishing.

An unrelated film tie-in was released in 2007 as a one-shot I Am Legend: Awakening published in a San Diego Comic-Con special by Vertigo.

Audiobook
A nine-part abridged reading of the novel performed by Angus MacInnes was originally broadcast on BBC Radio 7 in January 2006 and repeated in January 2018.

Films
I Am Legend has been adapted into a feature-length film three times, as well as into a direct-to-video feature film called I Am Omega. Differing from the book, each of them portrays the Neville character as an accomplished scientist. The three adaptations show him finding a remedy and passing it on. Adaptations differ from the novel by setting the events three years after the disaster, instead of happening “in the span of” three years. Also adaptations are set in the near future, a few years after the film's release, while the novel is set 20 years after its publication date.

The Last Man on Earth

In 1964, Vincent Price starred as Dr. Robert Morgan (rather than "Neville") in The Last Man on Earth (the original title of this Italian production was L'ultimo uomo della Terra). Matheson wrote the original screenplay for this adaptation, but due to later rewrites did not wish his name to appear in the credits; as a result, Matheson is credited under the pseudonym "Logan Swanson".

The Omega Man

In 1971, a far different version was produced, titled The Omega Man. It starred Charlton Heston (as Robert Neville) and Anthony Zerbe. Matheson had no influence on the screenplay for this film, and although the premise remains, it deviates from the novel in several ways, removing the infected people's vampiric characteristics, except their sensitivity to light. In this version, the infected are portrayed as nocturnal, black-robed, albino mutants, known as the Family. Though intelligent, they eschew modern technology, believing it (and those who use it, such as Neville) to be evil and the cause of humanity's downfall.

I Am Legend

In 2007, a third adaptation of the novel was produced, this time titled I Am Legend. Directed by Francis Lawrence and starring Will Smith as Robert Neville, this film uses both Matheson's novel and the 1971 Omega Man film as its sources. This adaptation also deviates significantly from the novel. In this version, the infection is caused by a vaccine originally intended to cure cancer. Some vampiric elements are retained, such as sensitivity to UV light and attraction to blood. The infected are portrayed as nocturnal, feral creatures of limited intelligence who hunt the uninfected with berserker-like rage. Other creatures, such as dogs, are also infected by the virus. The ending of the film was also altered to portray Neville as sacrificing his life to save humanity, rather than being executed for crimes against the surviving vampiric humans, although a deleted ending for the film was closer in spirit to the book. The film takes place in New York City in 2009 and 2012 rather than Los Angeles in 1975–1977.

See also

 Apocalyptic and post-apocalyptic fiction
 The Last Man (Mary Shelley novel)
 Survivalism
 Vampire literature
 Zombie

References

External links

 The I Am Legend Archive
 

1954 American novels
1954 science fiction novels
Fiction set in 1976
Novels set in the 1970s
American novels adapted into films
American post-apocalyptic novels
American horror novels
American vampire novels
Gold Medal Books books
Novels about suicide
Novels about viral outbreaks
Novels by Richard Matheson
Novels set in Los Angeles
Science fiction horror novels
Science fiction novels adapted into films